The men's heavyweight event was part of the boxing programme at the 1936 Summer Olympics. The weight class was the heaviest contested, and allowed boxers over 175 pounds (79.4 kilograms). The competition was held from Monday, August 10, 1936 to Saturday, August 15, 1936. Seventeen boxers from 17 nations competed.

Medalists

Results

References

External links
Official Olympic Report
 

Heavyweight